Joyce Marie Giraud Mojica (born April 4, 1975), also known as Joyce Giraud de Ohoven, is a Puerto Rican actress, model, philanthropist, film and television producer. Firstly in 1994, she competed in Miss World 1994 and was unable to make in top 10 and lost against Miss India, Aishwarya Rai. In 1998, Giraud was crowned Miss Universe Puerto Rico 1998, and represented Puerto Rico at Miss Universe 1998, where she placed as the second runner-up. She has since appeared in acting roles in television and film, and beginning in 2013 was a housewife on The Real Housewives of Beverly Hills for its fourth season.

Early life and education
Giraud was born in Aguas Buenas, Puerto Rico. She graduated at 16, and shortly began modelling. Giraud attended the Interamerican University of Puerto Rico. She has two Bachelor of Arts degrees; one in Social Work and one in Special Education. After graduating she worked with underprivileged children and public housing projects in Puerto Rico.

Career
Giraud began modeling to help her mother pay for her university studies and became one of the top models of Puerto Rico. She has appeared in numerous national and international campaigns. She describes having been discovered while working at the drive-thru of a KFC restaurant.

After winning the Miss Universe Puerto Rico, Giraud discovered her love of acting when director Vicente Castro cast her as the lead in his Coralito Tiene Dos Maridos, a remake of Sonia Braga's Dona Flor y Sus Dos Maridos. She received such great reviews that she found another passion in life. After doing many small roles in her native Puerto Rico, Giraud moved to Miami, Florida where she continued a successful modeling career. In 2001, after being the undefeated model of Star Search, she decided to take the leap toward Los Angeles where she has received parts in numerous films and TV shows.

In film, Giraud has had roles in David Fincher's Girl with the Dragon Tattoo; Dude, Where's My Car?, Miss Castaway, and Slayer. She has starred in TV shows like Baywatch, The Suite Life of Zack and Cody, Heist and Joey.  Starting in 2007 she starred in the first two seasons of Tyler Perry's House of Payne as "Angel," and in 2013 she was a lead in NBC's Siberia.  In 2013, she joined the main cast The Real Housewives of Beverly Hills for the fourth season (and wouldn’t return for a second), becoming the show's first Latina housewife. During her run on the show she was awarded with the "Loveliest Locks" award at Bravo's The Real Housewives Awards.

As a producer, Giraud executive produced the film Shadow People, as well as the TV show Siberia, and is credited as co-producer on the upcoming film Back Roads, based on the bestselling novel. In 2012, Giraud created the annual international beauty pageant Queen of the Universe, benefiting the programs of the UNESCO Foundation for Children in Need.  Since then she has produced and directed the annual event. In 2014, Giraud opened a school in Senegal, Africa with the YOU Foundation for Children in Need.

In 2014 she co-created the Spanish-language reality show Rica, Famosa, Latina and also serves as its executive producer.  In 2015 she also created its companion talk show Rica la Noche, serving as both its host and executive producer.

Pageantry and modeling

Giraud has been one of the few Puerto Rican Supermodels, and has been featured on numerous magazine covers and in international campaigns.

In her early career, Giraud participated in a number of beauty pageants and became a titleholder multiple times, leading to the Miss Universe 1998 pageant where she finished as second runner-up.  She is a two-time Miss Puerto Rico and previously represented Puerto Rico at Miss World 1994. Giraud won the 1994 Miss World Puerto Rico and the titles of Most Beautiful Hair, Most Beautiful Smile; Most Beautiful Face and Best Runway. She later represented Puerto Rico in the Queen of the Atlantics International in Spain, and won the title Queen of the Atlantics 1995. In 1997, she represented Puerto Rico in the Miss Venus International in Jacksonville, Florida and won her hometown the title. In 1998, Giraud won the title of Miss Aguas Buenas and then was crowned Miss Universe Puerto Rico. She also won the titles of Most Beautiful Hair, Most Beautiful Face, Best Body and the Miss Photogenic Award.

Despite a scandal that almost cost her the crown due to some sexy modeling shots, Giraud was cleared by Donald Trump to compete in the Miss Universe 1998 pageant in Hawaii where she was a crowd favorite and finished as 2nd runner-up behind Veruska Ramírez of Venezuela and winner Wendy Fitzwilliam of Trinidad and Tobago. Later that year, she wrote a book called "Joyce, Dreams and Realities", based on her experiences in the Miss Universe pageant.

In 2000, Giraud became the only undefeated model to win every episode of Star Search aka Destination Stardom in Honolulu, Hawaii.

Personal life
Giraud is married to Academy Award–nominated producer Michael Ohoven. They have two children, Leonardo Alexander Michael Mario Benjamin Giraud de Ohoven (b. 2010) and Michael Valentino Mario Arthur Benjamin Giraud de Ohoven (b. 2011).

Giraud is Catholic.

Filmography

Film and television

Music videos

Producer

See also

 List of Puerto Ricans
Nunez v. Caribbean Int’l News Corp.

References

External links
 
 

1975 births
21st-century Puerto Rican actresses
Living people
Miss Puerto Rico winners
Miss Universe 1998 contestants
Miss World 1994 delegates
People from Aguas Buenas, Puerto Rico
Puerto Rican female models
Puerto Rican film actresses
Puerto Rican people of French descent
Puerto Rican people of Spanish descent
Puerto Rican television actresses
Puerto Rican television personalities
The Real Housewives cast members